Air Marshal Sir Gerard Michael David Mayhew,  (born 15 February 1969) is a senior Royal Air Force officer, who served as Deputy Commander Operations, Headquarters Air Command between May 2019 and August 2022.

Early life and education
Mayhew was born on 15 February 1969 in Sutton Coldfield, Warwickshire, (now in the West Midlands), England. He was educated at St Benedict's Catholic High School, a voluntary aided Catholic school in Alcester, Warwickshire, and at Alcester Grammar School, a grammar school in Alcester.

Military career
Mayhew was commissioned into the Royal Air Force on 28 July 1988 as an acting pilot officer. He served as an air traffic control officer from 1988 to 1990. In 1990, he trained as a pilot and became a Qualified Weapons Instructor (QWI). His early career as a pilot was spent flying the Jaguar and Tornado, and he has more than 3000 flying hours. From 2007 to 2009, he served as Officer Commanding No. 13 Squadron RAF.

In January 2013, Mayhew was appointed Air Officer Scotland and Officer Commanding RAF Leuchars. One of his main duties was to oversee the transfer of Leuchars, then an RAF station, to the British Army as a barracks; this was finalised in March 2015. He stepped down as Air Officer Scotland on 17 November 2014. From April 2015 to April 2016, he was a member of the Strategic Defence and Security Review Team in the Cabinet Office. He was appointed a Commander of the Order of the British Empire in the 2015 Queen's Birthday Honours. On 28 April 2016 was promoted to air vice marshal and appointed Air Officer Commanding No. 1 Group. 

In August 2018, Mayhew succeeded Air Vice Marshal Michael Wigston as Assistant Chief of the Air Staff. In May 2019, he became Deputy Commander Operations, Headquarters Air Command and was promoted to air marshal. Mayhew was appointed Knight Commander of the Order of the Bath (KCB) in the 2022 New Year Honours.

References

|-

|-

|-

|-

British aviators
Knights Commander of the Order of the Bath
Commanders of the Order of the British Empire
Living people
People educated at Alcester Grammar School
Royal Air Force air marshals
Royal Air Force personnel of the Iraq War
1969 births
Air traffic controllers
Military personnel from Warwickshire